The African Solidarity Fund (ASF), also known by its French name and acronym (Fonds de Solidarité Africain, FSA), is a multilateral, financial guarantee institution based in Niamey, Niger. The purpose of the ASF is to contribute to the economic and social development of its regional member states by facilitating access to credit for states and public and private enterprises in its area of operation, to finance productive investment projects, and to mobilize local and external savings, in particular by providing loan guarantees on the financial markets.

Historic overview
The Agreement establishing the African Solidarity Fund was adopted by the National Assembly of France and signed in Paris on 21 December 1976. The purpose of the ASF at that time was to facilitate the economic development of the participating African States - mainly States most disadvantaged by structural factors - by contributing to the financing of investment projects of particular interest. Fifteen African States and France participated in the creation of the Fund. The application for membership of three other African countries was accepted by the original members as early as April 1977. In France, the creation of the Fund was the subject of Law no. 77-732 of 7 July 1977.

ASF operations began in September 1979.

The French National Assembly adopted several amendments to the Agreement establishing the Fund in 1991. Law No. 91-1401 of 31 December 1991 validated changes to the conditions of guarantees of repayment, the headquarters, the resources, the operations, and the organization of the Fund. With regard to the headquarters, Law No. 91-1401 indicates that – even if the Agreement of 21 December 1976 had fixed the seat "provisionally" in Paris – since its creation, the headquarters of the Fund had always been established de facto in Niamey, Republic of Niger.

After more than 30 years of existence, the Fund's constituent texts were subject to further revision. Thus, at their meeting on 20 December 2008, held in Niamey, the Ministers responsible for the Fund adopted the Revised Agreement establishing the African Solidarity Fund. The Revised Agreement entered into force upon notification of its ratification by the majority of signatory States. France, which ratified the Agreement of 21 December 1976 and participated in the activities of the Fund until 2000, is not among the signatories to the Revised Agreement.

At the end of 2021, a first amendment was adopted by the representatives of the member countries of the ASF concerning several changes to the Revised Agreement of 2008, particularly with regard to the transfer of powers from the General Assembly to the Board of Governors and the definitions of the purpose and missions of the ASF.

Mission
The mission of the ASF is to contribute to the economic development and social progress of its African member states by facilitating, through its intervention techniques, access to the financial resources needed to carry out investment projects and other income-generating activities.

Member States
The 16 member states of the ASF are Benin, Burkina Faso, Burundi, Central African Republic, Côte d'Ivoire, Gabon, Guinea, Guinea-Bissau, Mali, Mauritania, Mauritius, Niger, Rwanda, Senegal, Chad and Togo.

Organization
The management of the ASF's internal structures is ensured by the Board of Governors, the Board of Directors and the Director General. The Board of Governors is composed of the Ministers of Finance of the Member States. The Board of Directors includes one administrator per member state. The Director General is named by the Board of Directors and tasked with the management of ASF's daily operations.

The Specialised Committees include ad hoc and permanent committees that deliberate on operational and institutional matters as mandated by the Board of Directors.

The mobilization and allocation of resources
The financial resources of the ASF consist of endowments resulting from shareholder (member state) capital payments, operational revenue, investment gained from earnings, grants, resources allocated to specific tasks related to third-party fund management, and revenue from fixed deposits.

The ASF intervenes in all sectors of the national economies of its member states, in particular in basic infrastructure, industries and energy.

The types of intervention
The principal types of intervention are the guarantee, refinancing, interest rate subsidies, stake acquisition, third party fund management, and arrangement of structuring the financing for small and medium-sized enterprises (SMEs).

As of December 31, 2020, the cumulative approvals of guarantees reached EUR 1,164.1 million, in favor of 442 projects in 15 of the Fund's member states. These interventions enabled the mobilization of financing amounting to EUR 2,252.3 million. In fiscal year 2021, 51 guarantee requests were approved for a total amount of EUR 199.8 million.

Regional and international partners
Since 1996, the ASF has worked closely with the West African Development Bank (BOAD). Their cooperation agreement was renewed in November 2013. As part of this agreement, the ASF provided both guarantees and interest rate subsidies for several loans. This permitted the BOAD to increase the volume of loans that it provides to investors in the West African region.

In July 2018, the ASF signed a partnership agreement with the French Public Investment Bank Bpifrance. The general objective of this partnership is to promote the development of the private sector and the commercial public sector in ASF member countries. Bpifrance wants to thereby strengthen the capacities of the ASF to better meet the needs of investors in its areas of intervention.

On January 25, 2020, the ASF signed a partnership agreement with the Development Bank of the Central African States (BDEAC). This agreement was signed with a view to increasing the financing of public and private investments in ASF member states. For the ASF, this implied a substantial increase of ASF interventions in the Central African region. In a follow up to this partnership agreement, the BDEAC, ASF and the Gabonese company SERUS Investments SA convened on September 6, 2021 in Niamey, Niger, to sign a guarantee agreement facilitating the construction of a major business and hotel complex in Moanda, Gabon. ASF agreed to guarantee 60% of the proposed investment loan, amounting to the equivalent of about 2.74 million USD.

Ratings
The ASF has been subject to four external audits by the West Africa Rating Agency (WARA), conducted in 2018, 2019, 2020 and 2021. The most recent external audit, conducted in July 2021, assigned an overall rating of AA+ while the outlook was rated positive. The auditors noted, among other things, robust capitalization, very high asset liquidity, good geographic and sector diversification, sound governance, and prudent strategic positioning. Asset quality, as measured by the ratio of gross delinquencies to total on- and off-balance sheet liabilities, averaged 5.7 percent over the past three years, which is a good level according to WARA's rating scale. WARA's rating reports are available online.

In December 2022, GCR Ratings (GCR) affirmed FSA's long-term issuer rating of AA+(WU) on its regional rating scale. The outlook was changed from positive to stable. In addition, GCR affirmed the short-term issuer rating of A1+(WU). Note, however, that the analytical methodology that was used by WARA (see above) is significantly different from that of GCR in the case of supranational entities.

Performance
In January 2021, ASF's compliance with ISO 9001:2015 was certified by the UK branch of Veritas Certification Holding SAS. Compliance with ISO 9001:2015 may serve as an objective and verifiable indicator of ASF's strong performance in terms of operational management and fund administration.

Regional significance
The ASF is one of the three main multilateral financial guarantee institutions on the African continent, the others being: the African Guarantee Fund (AGF) and the Fonds Africain de Garantie et de Coopération Economique (FAGACE). Due to differences in their corporate reporting practices, it is difficult to compare the performance of these three regional bodies. Nevertheless, it is noteworthy that the ASF has achieved a higher independent rating (AA+) than the AGF (AA-) and FAGACE (AA-). ASF's and FAGACE's rating reports are available on the CGR Rating website.

Perspectives
Mauritania and Guinea joined the ASF in July 2021 and May 2022 respectively. Ten other African countries have indicated their intention to join the ASF: Angola, Botswana, Cameroon, Cape Verde, Comoros, Gambia, Ghana, Nigeria, Republic of Congo and Uganda.

The President of Chad, Idriss Déby, has recommended that the ASF should be transformed into a specialized institution of the African Union. This recommendation has received the support of the Prime Minister of Niger, Brigi Rafini.

External links

References

International finance